Tweeddale West is one of the eleven wards used to elect members of the Scottish Borders Council. It elects three Councillors.

Councillors

Election Results

2022 Election
2022 Scottish Borders Council election

2017 Election
2017 Scottish Borders Council election

2013 By-election

2012 Election
2012 Scottish Borders Council election

2007 Election
2007 Scottish Borders Council election

References

Wards of the Scottish Borders